Khurkhi is a rural locality (a selo) and the administrative centre of Khurkhinsky Selsoviet, Laksky District, Republic of Dagestan, Russia. The population was 684 as of 2010. There are 5 streets.

Geography 
Khurkhi is located 9 km south of Kumukh (the district's administrative centre) by road, on the left bank of the Khunnikh River. Tulizma and Shara are the nearest rural localities.

Nationalities 
Laks live there.

References 

Rural localities in Laksky District